Neumayer Channel is a channel 16 miles (26 km) long in a NE-SW direction and about 1.5 miles (2.4 km) wide, separating Anvers Island from Wiencke Island and Doumer Island, in the Palmer Archipelago. The southwest entrance to this channel was seen by Eduard Dallmann, leader of the German  1873-74 expedition, who named it Roosen Channel. The Belgian Antarctic Expedition, 1897–99, under Gerlache, sailed through the channel and named it for Georg von Neumayer. The second name has been approved because of more general usage.

Neumayer Channel is known for its majestic cliffs, an attraction for tourists who come to the region. It is said to be like a maze with no visible exits because of its inverted S-shape. Its entrance and exits both have sharp bends.

Geology
The Neumayer Channel Tectonic Block is bounded by the Neumayer Fault and the Fournier Fault, which are parallel SW-NE trending strike-slip faults.  The block consists of an Early Tertiary granite-granodiorite pluton intruded by a system of Early of Late Tertiary vertical dykes.  These intrusive rocks are overlain by basaltic-trachyandesitic lavas and tuffs.

See also
Gerlache Strait Geology
Green Reef

References

Straits of the Palmer Archipelago
Geography of Anvers Island
Doumer Island
Wiencke Island